Evolution is the 12th album by Masami Okui, released on 4 October 2006. The album title came from Okui's independent record label company name Evolution.

Track listing
"Soldier ~Love Battlefield~"
Lyrics: Masami Okui
Composition, arrangement: Hidetake Yamamoto
"zero -G-"
 anime television Ray the Animation opening song
 Lyrics: Masami Okui
 Composition: Monta
 Arrangement: Hideyuki Daichi Suzuki
""
 Lyrics: Masami Okui
 Composition: Kenjiro Sakiya
 Arrangement: Atsushi Yamazaki
""
Lyrics: Masami Okui
Composition, arrangement: Kenjiro Sakiya
"Lunatic Summer"
 Lyrics, composition: Masami Okui
 Arrangement: Monta
""
Lyrics: Masami Okui
Composition, arrangement: Macaroni
""
Lyrics, composition: Masami Okui
Arrangement: Takahito Eguchi
"Wild Spice (Trance Mix)"
 anime television Muteki Kanban Musume opening song
 Lyrics: Masami Okui
 Composition: Monta
 Arrangement: Monta, 1DT
""
Lyrics, composition: Masami Okui
Arrangement: Hideyuki Daichi Suzuki
"Soul Mate"
Lyrics: Masami Okui
Composition, arrangement: Hidetake Yamamoto

Sources
Official website: Makusonia

2006 albums
Masami Okui albums